The 1977–78 Boise State Broncos men's basketball team represented Boise State University during the 1977–78 NCAA Division I men's basketball season. The Broncos were led by fifth-year head coach Bus Connor and played their home games on campus at Bronco Gymnasium in Boise, Idaho.

Senior guard Steve Connor was named to the all-conference team; forwards Trent Johnson and Danny Jones were on the second team. The next Bronco on the first team was Vince Hinchen in 1984.

Boise State did not return to the conference tournament until 1984, when it expanded to include all eight teams.

Postseason result

|-
!colspan=6 style=| Big Sky tournament

References

External links
Sports Reference – Boise State Broncos – 1977–78 basketball season

Boise State Broncos men's basketball seasons
Boise State
Boise State